Dongpo pork, also known as Dongpo meat, is a Hangzhou dish which is made by pan-frying and then red cooking pork belly. The pork is cut thick, about  square, and should consist equally of fat and lean meat. The skin is left on. The mouthfeel is oily but not greasy and the dish is fragrant with wine. The dish is named after the Song Dynasty poet and gastronome Su Dongpo.

Origins
Legend has it that during Su Dongpo's life of poverty during his banishment to Hangzhou, he improved on the traditional process. He first braised the pork, added huangjiu (yellow wine) to make red-braised pork, then slowly stewed it on low heat. In their scholarly work Chinese Gastronomy, Lin Hsiang Ju and Lin Tsuifeng give the recipe "The Fragrance of Pork: Tungpo Pork", and remark that the "square of fat is named after Su Tungpo, the poet, for unknown reasons. Perhaps it is just because he would have liked it."

Dongpo Pork experienced three phases of popularity, from first appearance to mainstream appreciation. The history of the dish is said to parallel the experiences of Su Dongpo: from Xuzhou, a northern city of Jiangsu province, where Dongpo pork first appeared under the name of Huizeng pork; to Huangzhou, today Huanggang of Hubei province, where Su Dongpo finalized the method and recipe; and, finally, to Hangzhou, where Dongpo pork was officially named and became widely known across China.

See also

References

External links

 How to make Dong Po Rou

Hangzhou cuisine
Chinese pork dishes
Su Shi